Imam dečka nemirnog is the debut studio album by Serbian singer Dragana Mirković. It was released in 1984.

Track listing

References

1984 albums
Dragana Mirković albums